Maha Pyauk (d. November 1400) was governor of Yamethin and a key army commander from 1395/96 to 1400. He emerged as one of the pretenders to the Ava throne after King Tarabya's assassination. But Pyauk himself was assassinated by Prince Theiddat, who wanted his elder brother Minkhaung to succeed.

Brief
Pyauk was a younger brother of Governor-General Thilawa of Yamethin. After Thilawa's death in 1395/96, King Swa Saw Ke of Ava appointed Pyauk to be the next governor of Yamethin as well as the commander of the army Thilawa previously commanded. According to the royal chronicles, Pyauk took command of an army consisted of 60 elephants, 800 cavalry and 10,000 men.

Pyauk became a pretender to the throne in November 1400 when King Tarabya was assassinated just seven months in office. The court led by Min Yaza executed the assassin Gov. Thihapate of Tagaung, and selected Minkhaung, another son of Swa. But Minkhaung, who did not command an army, was concerned about Pyauk, and told the court to offer the throne to Pyauk instead. But Minkhaung's younger brother Theiddat disagreed with his brother's decision. As Pyauk marched with his large army to Ava to take over the throne, Theiddat and his small army ambushed Pyauk near Pinya, and successfully assassinated Pyauk.

After Pyauk's death, Minkhaung ascended the throne on 25 November 1400. The new king appointed Min Yaza's son Pauk Hla governor of Yamethin.

References

Bibliography
 
 
 
 

Ava dynasty
1400 deaths